Gospodinovo is a rural locality (a village) in Pekshinskoye Rural Settlement, Petushinsky District, Vladimir Oblast, Russia. The population was 1 as of 2010.

Geography 
Gospodinovo is located on the Nergel River, 36 km northeast of Petushki (the district's administrative centre) by road. Nerazh is the nearest rural locality.

References 

Rural localities in Petushinsky District